is a Japanese footballer currently playing as a defender.

Career statistics

Club
.

Notes

References

External links

2001 births
Living people
Association football people from Hyōgo Prefecture
University of Tsukuba alumni
Japanese footballers
Japan youth international footballers
Association football defenders
J3 League players
Cerezo Osaka players
Cerezo Osaka U-23 players